Jocelyn Rae and Anna Smith were the defending champions, however Rae retired from professional tennis in 2017, whilst Smith has been inactive in professional tennis since 2019.

Jesika Malečková and Renata Voráčová won the title, defeating Katarína and Viktória Kužmová in the final, 2–6, 7–5, [13–11].

Seeds

Draw

Draw

References

External Links
Main Draw

Slovak Open - Doubles